The 2016 Nasirnagar violence was an attack on the minority Hindu community by Islamic extremists in Nasirnagar Upazila, Bangladesh over an allegedly defamatory social media post by a Hindu fisherman against Islam on 30 October 2016.  The attack left 19 temples and approximately 300 houses vandalized and over 100 people injured.

See also
 1962 Rajshahi massacres
 1964 East-Pakistan riots
 1971 Bangladesh genocide
 Operation Searchlight
 Chuknagar massacre
 Jathibhanga massacre
 Shankharipara massacre
 Razakar 
 1989 Bangladesh pogroms
 1990 Bangladesh anti-Hindu violence
 1992 Bangladesh violence
 2012 Chirirbandar violence
 2012 Fatehpur violence
 2012 Hathazari violence
 2012 Ramu violence
 2013 Bangladesh Anti-Hindu violence
 2014 Bangladesh anti-Hindu violence
 Noakhali riots 
 Persecution of indigenous peoples in Bangladesh
 Persecution of Hindus in Bangladesh
 Persecution of Buddhists in Bangladesh
 Persecution of Chakma buddhists
 Persecution of Ahmadis in Bangladesh
 Persecution of Christians in Bangladesh
 Persecution of atheists and secularists in Bangladesh
 Freedom of religion in Bangladesh
 Human rights in Bangladesh

References

Further reading
 
 
 
 

Hinduism and Islam
Terrorist incidents in Bangladesh in 2016